Alassane Sidibe (born 9 June 2002) is an Ivorian footballer who plays as midfielder for Italian  club Ascoli on loan from Atalanta.

Career 
Sidibe started playing football at Collelongo and at Capistrello. In 2017, he moved to Atalanta. Sidibe scored ten goals in the 2019–20 season with the under-18s team. In the following season, he scored ten goals in 28 appearances with the under-19s. On 22 January 2022, Sidibe debutted with the first team in a 0–0 draw against Lazio.

On 30 August 2022, Sidibe joined Cosenza on a season-long loan. On 31 January 2023, he moved on a new loan to Ascoli.

References

External links 

2002 births
Living people
Ivorian footballers
Association football midfielders
Atalanta B.C. players
Cosenza Calcio players
Ascoli Calcio 1898 F.C. players
Serie A players
Serie B players
Ivorian expatriate footballers
Expatriate footballers in Italy
Ivorian expatriate sportspeople in Italy